Kurhaus (German for "spa house" or "health resort") may refer to:

 Kurhaus of Baden-Baden in Germany
 Kurhaus, Wiesbaden in Germany
 Kurhaus, Meran in South Tyrol, Italy
 Kurhaus of Scheveningen in the Netherlands
 Kurhaus Bergün, a grand hotel